Jeff Stone (born January 28, 1961) is an American businessman and former politician.  A Republican, he was a member of the Wisconsin State Assembly from 1998 through 2013.

Biography
Stone was born in Topeka, Kansas. He was raised in Zanesville, Ohio, and graduated from West Muskingum High School before returning to Topeka to attend Washburn University. He graduated from that institution in 1983 with a Bachelor of Arts in political science and history, magna cum laude.

State and local politics
After moving to Wisconsin, Stone served in the city council of Greenfield, Wisconsin, from 1994 to 1998. He was elected to the Wisconsin State Assembly in a special election in 1998. He was reelected seven times and resigned in October 2013.

In 2010, Stone announced his candidacy for the office of Milwaukee County Executive, challenging Jim Sullivan, Lee Holloway, Chris Abele, and Iesha Griffin in the nonpartisan February primary. While Stone won the primary with 43% of the vote, he lost the general election to Chris Abele.

On October 14, 2013, Stone resigned from the Wisconsin State Assembly; he will be working for the Wisconsin Public Service Commission as the division administrator for Water Compliance and Consumer Affairs.

Business career
Stone and his wife Lynn are co-owners of the Greendale-based company the Printing Factory.

As of February 2011, there were no records with the Wisconsin Department of Financial Institutions indicating the existence or corporate standing of the company.

Voter ID
In 2005, Stone co-sponsored a Voter ID bill with Senator Joe Leibham of Sheboygan. The bill passed the State Assembly and Senate, but was vetoed by Democratic Governor Jim Doyle.

In 2011, Stone and Leibham introduced a similar Voter ID bill providing more oversight and restrictions than past legislative proposals. Stone stated that his bill will provide people working at the polls with the right tools to know if the person voting is the person they claim to be. Opponents of the bill argue that the law will result in the suppression of votes of minority voters who don't have photo identification. Supporters argue that it would protect against the type of voter fraud allegedly observed in Milwaukee during the 2004 presidential election.

Notes

External links
Wisconsin Historical Society-Jeff Stone
 
Campaign 2010 campaign contributions at Wisconsin Democracy Campaign

Republican Party members of the Wisconsin State Assembly
Wisconsin city council members
Washburn University alumni
Politicians from Topeka, Kansas
Politicians from Zanesville, Ohio
People from Greenfield, Wisconsin
Businesspeople from Wisconsin
1961 births
Living people
21st-century American politicians